= Deborah Baumgold =

American philosopher

Education
- Education: Princeton University (PhD)

Philosophical work
- Era: 21st-century philosophy
- Region: Western philosophy
- Institutions: University of Oregon
- Main interests: political philosophy

Deborah Baumgold is an American philosopher and Professor Emerita of Political Science at the University of Oregon. She is known for her works on Thomas Hobbes's thought. She is the editor-in-chief of Hobbes Studies.

== Books ==
- Hobbes's Political Theory, Cambridge University Press, 1988, ISBN 9780521341257
- Contract Theory in Historical Context: Essays on Grotius, Hobbes, and Locke, Brill, 2010, ISBN 9789004184251
