= Hobbes Studies =

- Discipline: Philosophy
- Language: English
- Edited by: Alexandra Chadwick

Publication details
- History: 1988–present
- Publisher: Brill
- Frequency: Biannual

Standard abbreviations
- ISO 4: Hobbes Stud.

Indexing
- ISSN: 0921-5891 (print); 1875-0257 (web)

Links
- Journal homepage

Hobbes Studies is a biannual peer-reviewed academic journal that publishes research about philosophical, political, historical, literary, religious, and scientific aspects of Thomas Hobbes's thought as well as the reception of Hobbes’s work. Its Editor-in-Chief is Alexandra Chadwick and Associate Editor is Elad Carmel, and it is published with the International Hobbes Association and the European Hobbes Society's cooperation.
